Auleutes is a genus of snout and bark beetles in the family Curculionidae. There are at least 30 described species in Auleutes.

Species

References

Further reading

 
 
 
 
 
 
 

Curculionidae